Otatea, called weeping bamboo, is a genus of clumping bamboos in the grass family, native to Mexico, Central America, and Colombia.

The name derives from the Nahuatl (Aztec) word "otatl", meaning "bamboo".

Species
 Otatea acuminata (Munro) C.E.Calderón ex Soderstr. – widespread from Chihuahua to Oaxaca
 Otatea carrilloi Ruiz-Sanchez, Sosa & Mejía-Saulés – Chiapas
 Otatea fimbriata Soderstr. – widespread from Norte de Santander to Chiapas
 Otatea glauca L.G.Clark & G.Cortés – Chiapas
 Otatea ramirezii Ruiz-Sanchez – Querétaro
 Otatea reynosoana Ruiz-Sanchez & L.G.Clark – Guerrero, Jalisco, Nayarit
 Otatea rzedowskiorum Ruiz-Sanchez – Chiapas
 Otatea transvolcanica Ruiz-Sanchez & L.G.Clark – México State, Jalisco, Colima
 Otatea victoriae Ruiz-Sanchez – Hidalgo
 Otatea ximenae Ruiz-Sanchez & L.G.Clark – Oaxaca, Michoacán

References

Bambusoideae
Grasses of North America
Bambusoideae genera